¡¡Que corra la voz!! is the fifth studio album by the Spanish ska punk band Ska-P, released on 29 June 2002.

The album cover depicts Gato López with a megaphone and a medallion with the Anarchy symbol, bursting through the front page of a newspaper. The album title can be translated as "Spread the word!"

Track listing

Personnel 
 Pulpul – vocals, guitar
 Luismi – drums
 Julio – bass
 Joxemi – guitar
 Kogote – keyboard
 Pipi – backing vocals

External links 
Ska-P's official website

Ska-P albums
2002 albums